Saray is a district and town in the Van Province of Turkey. The current mayor is Caziye Duman from the Peoples' Democratic Party (HDP) 

An earthquake in February 2020 shook the region and many villages of the Saray district reported of damages.

References

Towns in Turkey
Populated places in Van Province
Districts of Van Province
Kurdish settlements in Turkey